Ahsha Rolle (born March 21, 1985) is a retired tennis player from the United States.

Tennis career
Ahsha began playing tennis when she was nine years old. Her career-high singles ranking is No. 82, achieved in September 2007. In October 2011, she peaked at No. 111 in the doubles rankings.

She played at the 2007 US Open as a wildcard entry, and defeated 17th seeded Tatiana Golovin in the first round, and Karin Knapp in the second before falling to Dinara Safina.

Due to injuries, Ahsha Rolle retired from professional tennis in 2013, at the age of 28.

ITF Circuit finals

Singles: 6 (3 titles, 3 runner-ups)

Doubles: 20 (10 titles, 10 runner-ups)

References

External links
 
 
 

1985 births
Living people
LGBT tennis players
American LGBT sportspeople
LGBT people from Florida
African-American female tennis players
American female tennis players
Sportspeople from Miami-Dade County, Florida
Tennis people from Florida
People from Miami Shores, Florida
Lesbian sportswomen
21st-century African-American sportspeople
21st-century African-American women
20th-century African-American people
21st-century LGBT people
20th-century African-American women